The Pearl River, also known by its Chinese name Zhujiang or Zhu Jiang in Mandarin pinyin or Chu Kiang and formerly often known as the , is an extensive river system in southern China.  The name "Pearl River" is also often used as a catch-all for the watersheds of the Xi ("West"), Bei ("North"), and Dong ("East") rivers of Guangdong. These rivers are all considered tributaries of the Pearl River because they share a common delta, the Pearl River Delta. Measured from the farthest reaches of the Xi River, the  Pearl River system is China's third-longest river, after the Yangtze River and the Yellow River, and second largest by volume, after the Yangtze. The  Pearl River Basin drains the majority of Liangguang (Guangdong and Guangxi provinces), as well as parts of Yunnan, Guizhou, Hunan and Jiangxi in China; it also drains northern parts of Vietnam's Northeast Cao Bằng and Lạng Sơn provinces.

As well as referring to the system as a whole, the Pearl River (Zhu Jiang) name is applied to a specific branch within the system. This Pearl River is the widest distributary within the delta, although notably short. The waters that converge east of the Bei Jiang are first referred to as the Pearl River just north of Guangzhou. The Pearl River is famed as the river that flows through Guangzhou. The Pearl River's estuary, Bocca Tigris, is regularly dredged so as to keep it open for ocean vessels. The mouth of the Pearl River forms a large bay in the southeast of the delta, the Pearl River Estuary, the Bocca Tigris separates Shiziyang in the north, Lingdingyang in the south, and Jiuzhouyang at the southern tip of the estuary surrounded by the Wanshan Archipelago. This bay separates Macau and Zhuhai from Hong Kong and Shenzhen.

The Pearl River is so named because of the pearl-colored shells that lie at the bottom of the river in the section that flows through the city of Guangzhou.
Numerous brands are named after the river, like Zhujiang Brewery (Guangzhou) being one of the three largest domestic breweries in China, and Pearl River Bridge (Guangzhou) as a popular food manufacturer.
A 500 kV power line, suspended from three of the tallest pylons in the world, the Pylons of Pearl River Crossing, crosses the river near its mouth.

Image gallery

Settlements

Liuzhou
Guilin
Dongguan
Foshan
Zhuhai
Panyu
Zhongshan
Guangzhou
Hong Kong
Macau
Shenzhen
Wuzhou
Zhaoqing
Nanning
Guiping
Baise

Crossings

Guangzhou Bridge
Haiyin Bridge
Haizhu Bridge
Hong Kong-Zhuhai-Macau Bridge 
Huanan Bridge
Humen Pearl River Bridge
Hedong Bridge
Huangpu Bridge
Jiangwan Bridge
Jiefang Bridge
Nansha Bridge
Pazhou Bridge
Renmin Bridge
Shiziyang Tunnel
Xinguang Bridge
Yajisha Bridge
Shenzhen–Zhongshan Bridge (under construction)

Tributaries 
 Bei (北江)
 Dong (东江)
 Beilingshui (贝岭水)
 Li (浰江)
 Xinfeng (新丰江)
 Qiuxiang (秋香江)
 Gongzhuangshui (公庄水)
 Xizhi (西枝江)
 Shimahe (石马河)
 Xi (西江)
 Yu (鬱江)
 Yong (邕江)
 Zuo (左江)
 You (右江)
 Xun (浔江)
 Qiang (黔江)
 Liu (柳江)
 Rong(融江)
 Hongshui (红水河)
 Beipan (北盘江)
 Nanpan (南盘江)
 Ba (灞水 or 灞河)
 Gui (桂江)
 Li (漓江)

See also

List of rivers in China
Geography of China
Ship lifts in China
List of rivers of Hong Kong
Pearl River Sources

References

 
Rivers of China
Drainage basins of the Pacific Ocean
Geography of South China
Geography of Western China
Rivers of Yunnan
Rivers of Guangdong
Rivers of Guizhou
Rivers of Guangxi
Rivers of Hong Kong
Rivers of Macau
South China
Bodies of water of the South China Sea